Gen. Marian Sowiński (born August 26, 1951 in Ruda, Poland) is a Polish general.

Brigadier-General Marian Sowiński has been commander of the special forces unit "GROM" (Thunder) from December 19, 1995 until December 6, 1997.

References

1951 births
Living people
Polish generals